Caucasus Online LLC is one of the largest Georgian Internet service provider and controls large part of the Georgian internet communications market. Caucasus Online was formed by unification of several major Georgian ISPs:Caucasus Network, Georgia Online and SaNet. in 2006. Since 2008 Telenet, the main provider of wireless and fiber-optic Internet in Georgia, merged with Caucasus Online.

Since 2008 Caucasus Online has been the sole owner of a 1,200-km submarine fiber-optic cable constructed by Tyco Electronics (today known as TE Subcom), through which it transits Internet traffic from Europe to south Caucasus and Caspian Region. The FOC was laid on the bottom of the Black Sea to provide a direct, high-quality fiber-optic Internet connection from Europe to Caucasus Region and Middle East. The project was developed by Caucasus Online in co-operation with Tyco Electronics in 2008. In September 2016 Caucasus Online sold its Retail business to Magticom and now Caucasus Online is a major wholesale operator in the region.

In 2019, Azerbaijani Neqsol Holding has acquired 49% of Caucasus Online for $61 million. Neqsol acquired 100% on 24 March 2021.

References

External links
 Caucasus Online website
 Tyco Telecommunications

Internet in Georgia (country)
Telecommunications companies of Georgia (country)
Telecommunications companies established in 1998
1998 establishments in Georgia (country)